Blue Soul is an album led by American trumpeter Blue Mitchell recorded and released in 1959 on the Riverside label.

Reception
The Allmusic review by Michael G. Nastos awarded the album 4½ stars and stated "This is one of the most precious jazz recordings of a year that would soon give sway to the Blue Note sound, and is in many real and important ways as much of a prelude as any other statement. It's a must-have for all serious mainstream jazz fans".

Track listing

Recorded September 24 (tracks 1 & 2), September 28 (tracks 5, 6, 8 & 9) and September 30 (tracks 3, 4 & 7), 1959.

Personnel
Blue Mitchell – trumpet  
Curtis Fuller – trombone (tracks 1, 2, 5, 6, 8 & 9)  
Jimmy Heath – tenor saxophone (tracks 1, 2, 5, 6, 8 & 9) 
Wynton Kelly – piano
Sam Jones – bass
Philly Joe Jones – drums

References

Riverside Records albums
Blue Mitchell albums
1959 albums
Albums produced by Orrin Keepnews